Chen Baoguo (born 9 March 1956) is a Chinese actor. He graduated from the Central Academy of Drama, Erjia in 1977 and has since acted in many films and television series, including The Emperor in Han Dynasty, Da Zhai Men and Rob-B-Hood. He is married to actress Zhao Kui'e (赵奎娥).

Filmography

Film

Stage plays

Television

Video games

Awards and nominations

References

 

1956 births
Living people
Male actors from Beijing
Chinese male stage actors
Chinese male film actors
Chinese male television actors
Central Academy of Drama alumni